Comte. Mairson C. Bezerra Airport  is the airport serving Araripina, Brazil.

Airlines and destinations

Access

See also
List of airports in Brazil

References

External links

Airports in Pernambuco